Pietro Paolo Bencini (c. 1670 – 6 July 1755) was an Italian Baroque composer and  Kapellmeister. He was the father of Antonio Bencini (died 13 March 1748), who was also known as a composer of sacred works.

Life
Bencini was born into a musical family. He became maestro di cappella at several churches in Rome. His compositional output consists mostly of religious music, including several oratorios and cantatas. He was maestro di cappella at the Chiesa Nuova (The Roman Oratory) from 1705 to 1743.

He left there to succeed Giuseppe Ottavio Pitoni (1657-1743) as maestro di cappella of the Cappella Giulia at Saint Peter's Basilica in Rome. Within the years of 1749 until 1753 he was supported by Niccolo Jomelli, because Bencini became more and more unable to work because of illness. During this time Jomelli, who was better known as a composer of operas, created the most of his sacral compositions. In 1753 Jomelli left Rome in order to succeed Ignaz Holzbauer in Stuttgart. On his death Bencini was succeeded by Giovanni Battista Costanzi (1704-1778).

Selected works

He is the author of compositions like oratories, masses, secular and sacral cantatas, liturgies, antiphones and psalms. Many of his sacral works are stored at the Vatican Library. Some of his oratories and additional spiritual music as following:

 Susanna a propheta Daniele vindicata (Giovanni Antonio Magnani, 1698)
 L' innocenza protetta (Giacomo Buonaccorsi, 1700)
 De inopia copia (Filippo Capistrelli, 1703)
 Salomon  (Francesco Posterla, 1704)
 Introduzione all'oratorio della passione di nostro signore Gesù Cristo (Pietro Ottoboni, 1707 e 1708)
 S. Andrea Corsini (Giacomo Buonaccorsi, 1722)
 Ad sacrum drama de passione Domini nostri Jesu Christi introductio (1725)
 Il sacrificio di Abramo (oratorio, libretto by Giacomo Buonaccorsi, 1708)
 Tra l'ombre piu romite (cantata)
 Rimembranza crudele (cantata)
 Clori che m'invaghi (cantata)
 Jesu redemptor omnium (Christmas hymn)

Further reading 
 La cappella Giulia: vol. I - I vespri nel XVIII secolo, a cura di Jean Lionnet, Lucca, 1995, Introduzione, pp. X-XIV.
 Rainer Heyink, Fest und Musik als Mittel kaiserlicher Machtpolitik. Das Haus Habsburg und die Deutsche Nationalkirche in Rom S. Maria dell'Anima, Tutzing, 2011

External links 
 Raoul Meloncelli, Bencini, Pietro Paolo, in Dizionario Biografico degli Italiani, vol. 8, Roma, 1966
 Musiciens de Rome de 1570 à 1750, informations recueillies par Jean Lionnet, réunies et publiées par Livia Lionnet
 https://archive.wikiwix.com/cache/index2.php?url=https%3A%2F%2Fportal.dnb.de%2Fopac.htm%3Fmethod%3DsimpleSearch%26query%3D103819088#, Archive of DNB (Katalog der Deutschen Nationalbibliothek)

References

1670s births
1755 deaths
Year of birth uncertain
Musicians from Rome
Italian male classical composers
Italian Baroque composers
Sacred music composers
18th-century Italian composers
18th-century Italian male musicians